Adolf Percl (14 October 1901 — 13 August 1951) was a Croatian footballer.

Club career
He was a forward and he played for Concordia Zagreb and BSK Belgrade in the Yugoslav First League during the 1920s. He was registered for Concordia on April 8, 1928.

International career
Percl was part of the Yugoslav football squad at the 1924 Summer Olympics and later he played 3 matches and scored 2 goals for the Yugoslav national team between 1926 and 1927.

References

External links
 

1900 births
1951 deaths
Sportspeople from Dubrovnik
Association football forwards
Yugoslav footballers
Yugoslavia international footballers
Olympic footballers of Yugoslavia
Footballers at the 1924 Summer Olympics
HŠK Concordia players
OFK Beograd players
Yugoslav First League players